Konjuh may refer to:

Places
 Konjuh (mountain), a mountain of Bosnia and Herzegovina
 Konjuh, Kratovo Municipality, North Macedonia
 Konjuh (Kruševac), a village in Serbia

People with the surname
 Ana Konjuh (born 1997), Croatian tennis player

See also